Maurice Lemaître (Maurice Édouard Jean Joseph Ghislain Lemaître; born Charleroi, 6 July 1898; died Etterbeek 25 December 1974) was a Belgian mechanical engineer who developed a steam locomotive exhaust system first used by the Nord-Belge railway company, a subsidiary of the French-owned Chemins de Fer du Nord.

The Lemaître exhaust (échappement Lemaître) – which featured a blastpipe with five nozzles in a circular pattern exhausting up a large-diameter chimney, plus a variable-area nozzle exhausting up the centre – produced an efficiency gain of around 10%.

The design was later improved by the Argentine engineer Livio Dante Porta, who devised the Lempor (a portmanteau of Lemaître and Porta) and later the Lemprex exhaust systems.

References

External links
The ultimate steam page – Steam Locomotive Exhaust Drawings
Lempor Exhaust

20th-century Belgian engineers
Belgian mechanical engineers
Belgian people in rail transport
Locomotive builders and designers
1974 deaths
1898 births